Jakub Lev (born December 6, 1990) is a Czech professional ice hockey player. He played with HC Plzeň in the Czech Extraliga during the 2010–11 Czech Extraliga season.

References

External links

1990 births
Living people
Czech ice hockey forwards
HC Plzeň players